Kalbuh is a village in Muscat, in northeastern Oman.

It is home to a small park, the Kalbuh Park, which faces the Arabian Sea.

References

Populated places in the Muscat Governorate